A chopper is a type of custom motorcycle which emerged in the US state of California in the late 1950s. A chopper employs modified steering angles and lengthened forks for a stretched-out appearance. They can be built from an original motorcycle which is modified ("chopped") or built from scratch. Some of the characteristic features of choppers are long front ends with extended forks often coupled with an increased rake angle, hardtail frames (frames without rear suspension), very tall "ape hanger" or very short "drag" handlebars, lengthened or stretched frames, and larger than stock front wheel. The "sissy bar", a set of tubes that connect the rear fender with the frame, and which are often extended several feet high, is a signature feature on many choppers.

Two famous examples of the chopper are customised Harley-Davidsons, the "Captain America" and "Billy Bike", seen in the 1969 film Easy Rider.

History

The Bob-Job Era, 1946–1959
Before there were choppers, there was the bobber, a motorcycle that had been "bobbed", or relieved of excess weight by removing parts. With the intent of making the bike lighter and faster, the fenders would often be removed, or at least to make it look better in the eyes of a rider seeking a more minimalist ride.

An early example of a bobber is the 1940 Indian Sport Scout "Bob-Job" which toured in the 1998 The Art of the Motorcycle exhibition. Indian Scouts and Chiefs of the time came with large, heavily valanced fenders, nearly reaching the center of the wheel on the 1941 Indian Series 441,  while racing bikes had tiny fenders or none at all. The large bikes exemplified the "dresser" motorcycle aesthetic and provided a counterpoint to the minimalist bobber, and café racers.

In the post–World War II United States, servicemen returning home from the war started removing all parts deemed too big, heavy, ugly, or not essential to the basic function of the motorcycle, such as fenders, turn indicators, and even front brakes. The large, spring-suspended saddles were also removed in order to sit as low as possible on the motorcycle's frame. These machines were lightened to improve performance for dirt-track racing and mud racing. In California, dry lake beds were used for long top speed runs. Motorcycles and automobiles ran at the same meets, and bobbers were an important part of the hotrod culture that developed in this era.

The first choppers were built in America and were an outgrowth of the milder customization trend that had originated after WW2 when returning soldiers and others began modifying cars and motorcycles, frequently to improve performance in top-speed races on dry lake beds in Southern California and similar desolate spaces such as unused airstrips in other parts of the country, or on the street for street racing. These early modified motorcycles were known as "bobbers", and there are many common features between bobbers and choppers, with choppers differentiated by more radical modifications, especially frame tube and geometry modifications ("chopped" by welding) intended to make the bike longer.

The earliest choppers tended to be based on Harley-Davidson motorcycles, at first making use of the Flathead, Knucklehead and Panhead engines—many of which could be found in surplus military and police motorcycles bought cheaply at auction. As new engines became available, they were soon utilized in choppers. British bikes, particularly Triumphs, were also a popular motor for choppers early on. As the Japanese manufacturers began offering larger engines in the late 1960s these motors were also quickly put to use by chopper builders. The Honda 750-4 was the most widely used Japanese motor for early chopper builders. Choppers have been created using almost every available engine, but builders have always shown a preference for older air-cooled designs. It is rare to see a chopper with a radiator.

Over time the choppers became more and more about achieving a certain look, rather than being primarily performance-oriented modifications. The modifications that had had their origin in hot-rodding evolved into an artistic and aesthetic direction. By the mid 1970s stock Japanese and European performance motorcycles would outperform most bobbers and choppers. The one exception to this was the drag racing arena, which placed a premium on pure engine power, rather than handling over curvy courses. Chopper styling continued to be influenced by drag-bike modifications throughout the 1960s and 1970s.

While all choppers are highly customized bikes, sometimes even being built from scratch using all custom parts, not all customized bikes are choppers. In Europe at roughly the same era that choppers were invented and popularized in the US, bikers modified their bikes (primarily English brands like Triumph, BSA, Norton, and Matchless) in a different way, to achieve different looks, performance goals and riding position. The resulting bikes are known as café racers and look very different from a chopper.

As the popularity of choppers grew, in part through exposure in movies such as the 1969 classic Easy Rider, several motorcycle brands took note and began to include chopper influenced styling in their factory offerings. None of the factories were willing to go all out and do things like abandon rear-suspension to achieve the classic chopper look, however. As a result, these bikes were given the name "factory customs" and are not considered choppers.

Over the decades since the first choppers were created many different trends and fads have taken hold and held sway, so that it is often possible for someone to look at a chopper and say that it is a "1970s" style or fits into a specific era or sub-type. Some contemporary builders specialize in building choppers that very exactly fit into these styles, which are frequently referred to as "old school" style choppers.

Late 1950s to 1960s - early choppers 

By the early 1960s there was a big enough contingent of people modifying motorcycles, still mostly big Harley-Davidsons, that a certain style had begun to take hold. A set of modifications became common: the fat tires and 16" wheels of the stock motorcycles were replaced with narrower tires often on a larger 19" or 21" wheel. Forward-mounted foot pegs replaced the standard large 'floorboard' footrests. Frequently the standard headlight and fuel tank were replaced with much smaller ones. Often upgraded chromed parts (either one-off fabricated replacements or manually chromed stock parts) were added. It is in this era that what we would today consider a chopper came into existence and began to be called the chopper.

During the 1960s, candy-colored paint, often multicolored and metal-flaked with different patterns, became a trend that allowed builders to further express their individuality and artistry. Soon many parts were being offered by small companies expressly for use in building choppers, not necessarily as performance parts as was common in the Bobber Era.

The first famous chopper builders came to prominence in this era, including Arlen Ness who was a leader in the "Frisco" or "Bay Area Chopper" style. Ness's bikes were characterized by having long low frames and highly raked front ends, typically 45 degrees or more, and frequently made use of springer front ends. Many made use of the newer Harley-Davidson Sportster motor, a simpler and more compact "unit motor" that included the transmission in the same housing as the motor itself, which lent itself nicely to Ness's stripped-down style. Many of Ness's bikes in this era retained the rear shocks of the donor Sportster to provide a more forgiving ride than the typical hardtail chopper.

In 1967 Denver Mullins (1944-1992) and Armando ″Mondo″ Porras opened ″Denver's Choppers″ in San Bernardino, California, and soon became famous for building "long bikes", often referred to as "Denver choppers". These featured even longer front ends than the Bay Area style and had a much higher frame (stretched "up and out"). Denver's was particularly well known for the springer forks that they fabricated, as well as the overall style of their bikes.

With choppers still not yet a mass market concept regional variations and formulations flourished in this period. Many innovations were tried in this period, found not to work that well, and then abandoned. A great deal of knowledge about how to build long bikes that handled well adjusting rake and trail was developed, yet less sophisticated builders also created a lot of bikes that had handling issues in this period as expertise was still scarce and closely held.

The 1970s: iconic choppers, diggers and Japanese motors

The huge success of the 1969 film Easy Rider instantly popularized the chopper around the world, and drastically increased the demand for them. What had been a subculture known to a relatively small group of enthusiasts in a few regions of the US became a global phenomenon. During the late 1960s, the first wave of European chopper builders emerged, such as the "Swedish Chopper" style, but Easy Rider brought attention everywhere to choppers.

The number of chopper-building custom shops multiplied, as did the number of suppliers of ready-made chopper parts. According to the taste and purse of the owner, chop shops would build high handlebars, or later Ed Roth's Wild Child designed stretched, narrowed, and raked front forks. Shops also custom-built exhaust pipes and many of the aftermarket kits followed in the late 1960s into the 1970s. Laws required (and in many locales still do) a retention fixture for the passenger, so vertical backrests called sissy bars became a popular installation, often sticking up higher than the rider's head.

While the decreased weight and lower seat position improved handling and performance, the main reason to build a chopper was to show off and provoke others by riding a machine that was stripped and almost nude compared to the stock Harley-Davidsons and automobiles of the period. Style trumped practicality, particularly as forks became longer and longer handling suffered. As one biker said, "You couldn't turn very good, but you sure looked good doing it."

The Digger became another popular style. Similar to the Frisco choppers Diggers were frequently even longer than earlier bikes, but still low. The coffin and prism shaped tanks on these bikes were frequently mated with very long front ends (12" over stock and more), with the archaic girder fork often being used to accomplish this instead of the more common springer or telescopic types. Body work was also moulded to flow seamlessly, using copious amounts of bondo. New paint colors and patterns included paisleys, day-glo and fluorescent, along with continuing use of metal-flakes and pearls.

Honda's groundbreaking 750 cc four-cylinder engine, first introduced to America in the 1969 CB-750, became widely available from salvage and wrecking operations and became a popular alternative to Harley-Davidson's motors. Harley's then-current big-twin motor, the Shovelhead, was extremely popular with chopper builders in this era, and use of the older motors, particularly the Knucklehead and Flathead declined as parts became harder to get and the performance of the new motors proved superior.

The 1980s and 1990s: improved engineering and aftermarket suppliers 

In 1984 Harley-Davidson, who had been using chopper inspired styling for a number of years, released the 'Softail', a design that hid the rear shocks under the engine creating a profile that looked a lot like a hard tail. This frame was initially offered in the Softail Custom, a bike that took many styling cues from choppers, including the narrow 21" front wheel. Buyers looking for the chopper look had a plausible factory alternative, and interest in choppers declined.

With some time out of the limelight chopper builders seemed to work on craft more than wild innovation in this period. While individual builders still built long bikes, the trend was towards more moderate geometries, and the basics of how to build a good handling chopper while still looking great became more common knowledge. In this period, it became possible to assemble a complete chopper using all aftermarket parts, companies like S&S Cycle built complete replacement engines based on Harley-Davidson engines, frame makers such as Paughco offered a variety of hardtail frames, and many bikes were built using these new repro parts. Super long girder and springer forked bikes were less popular in this era, while the use of telescopic forks grew, and builders upgraded to larger diameter tubes in both forks and frames to gain more rigidity.

Japanese bike builders offered a dizzying array of new bikes, including full-faired racing styled machines as well as many 'customs' that picked at chopper styling in a random way and rarely achieved the powerful integrated style that more and more custom chopper builders in this era seemed able to consistently achieve. As materials, fabrication and knowledge improved the performance of the better choppers improved. More powerful engines drove the need for stronger frames, brakes and bigger tires with more grip. These trends worked together so that as the 1990s closed the modern chopper was a larger looking, more powerful machine. The widespread use of CNC made it possible for even small shops to fabricate out of block aluminum, and billet components became a signature item often replacing stamped and chromed steel components of the earlier eras.

The 21st Century: Reality television 

The millennium began with the cable TV network The Discovery Channel creating a number of television shows around several custom bike builders who built choppers. The first, the 2000 special Motorcycle Mania, followed builder Jesse James of Long Beach, California, and is credited with creating "a new genre of reality TV" around choppers.
 
The celebrity builders featured on the cable shows enjoyed a large following. Companies like Jesse James' West Coast Choppers have been successful in producing expensive choppers, and a wide range of chopper-themed brands of merchandise such as clothing, automobile accessories and stickers.

The American Chopper reality television series featuring Paul Teutul Sr, and his sons Paul Jr. and Mike, ran six years starting in 2003, and featured bike building at Orange County Choppers (OCC).

2010: Backlash, Bobbers and the Old School Revival 

This led to a backlash, and a renewed interest in home garage fabricated bikes built on a budget with available materials. Many builders eschewed Harley "pattern" motors and frames and started building choppers out of neglected bikes like Yamaha XS-650 twins, old Harley Sportsters, and various 1980's so called UJM bikes (four cylinder air-cooled Japanese bikes - Universal Japanese Motorcycle).

Another aspect of the backlash was a return to more traditional styling. Bobbers were again in style: stock rake machines with a stripped-down look, often with flat or primer paints in charcoal grey, flat black, olive drab or brown.

Indian Larry and Paul Cox along with other New York City builders from Psycho Cycles are often credited with leading the movement back towards old school choppers in this period.  Indian Larry was a featured builder early on the series "Biker Build-Off" on Discovery network, and won all three build off competitions, highlighting the popularity of his old-school style.=
Three-inch-wide belt drives and  motors were still appreciated by many, but an increasing countermovement of people building bikes with Shovelhead motors and chain drive primaries has occurred. Springers and even girder forks have made yet another come back. Magazines such as Iron Horse, Street Chopper and Show Class cater to the retro, old-school and backyard builders, and feature more DIY technology than the TV builders with their million-dollar garages of the previous decade.

2020: Narrow Muscle Choppers 

Later-generation builders take the chopper concept but keep the bike small, nimble and performance-inspired while nodding the styling of yesteryear. Some common characteristics of these custom bikes may include tall front end, narrow tires, high-output motor, cradle seat slammed onto the frame, t-bars, mid controls for example.

Choppers in the UK 

In the UK, due to the cost and lack of availability of the v-twin engine, many chose to use British engines from bikes such as Triumph or BSA; following an increase in imports, Japanese engines have seen more use.

See also 

 Outline of motorcycles and motorcycling

References

Motorcycle customization
 
Kustom Kulture